James Monsees is an American businessman, and the co-founder (with Adam Bowen) and former chief product officer of Juul Labs, an electronic cigarette company.

Monsees is an alumnus of Whitfield School in St. Louis, Missouri.

Monsees earned a BA in Physics and Studio Art from Kenyon College, followed by an  MS in Product Design from Stanford University.

In December 2018, following Altria taking a 35% stake in Juul, Monsees's net worth increased from an estimated $730 million to more than $1.1 billion. After subsequent write-downs of the value of Juul, Forbes no longer considers Monsees a billionaire.

In March 2020, Monsees announced to his employees that he is stepping down as adviser and board member of Juul.

References

Living people

American company founders
Former billionaires
Kenyon College alumni
Stanford University alumni
Year of birth missing (living people)